Appert is a surname. Notable people with the surname include:

Benjamin Nicolas Marie Appert (1797–1847), French philanthropist
Eugène Appert (1814–1867), French painter
Nicolas Appert (1749–1841), the French inventor of airtight food preservation

See also
Appert Lake National Wildlife Refuge, Emmons County, North Dakota
Appert topology, named for Appert (1934), an example of a topology on the set Z+ = {1, 2, 3, ...} of positive integers
Appert's tetraka or Appert's greenbul (Xanthomixis apperti), a small passerine bird endemic to the south-west of Madagascar
Nicholas Appert Award, awarded every year since 1942 by the Chicago Section of the Institute of Food Technologists

Surnames from given names